The 2004–05 Vyshcha Liha season was the fourteenth since its establishment.

The season started on July 15, 2004, with all eight games of the first round. The last day of the competition was June 16, 2005. Shakhtar Donetsk won its second champion's title place ahead of the reigning champions Dynamo that held for the last couple of seasons. The Miners only lost two of their games, one at home to Metalist Kharkiv that had just returned to the top league and another one in Simferopol to Tavriya. Shakhtar also won both of their match-ups with Dynamo Kyiv. The top scorers competition was won by Oleksandr Kosyrin from Chornomorets Odessa who had 14 precise shots on goal.

Illichivets Mariupol was close to qualify for the European competition once again; however, it was not able to convert on the poor playing form of the leading Dnipro Dnipropetrovsk that had a bad stretch at the "finish line".

Both clubs from the Kiev region, FC Obolon Kyiv and FC Borysfen Boryspil, that performed very well last season were forced into relegation due to their poor performance. Especially, strikingly bad season had Borysfen that won three games.

Teams

Promotions
Zakarpattia Uzhhorod, the winners of the 2003–04 Ukrainian First League  – (returning after absence of 2 seasons)
Metalist Kharkiv, the runners-up of the 2003–04 Ukrainian First League  – (returning after absence of a seasons)

Location

Managers

League table

Results

Top goal scorers

External links
ukrsoccerhistory.com - source of information

Ukrainian Premier League seasons
1
Ukra